The Hanseman languages are a group of relatively closely related languages in New Guinea, spoken in the Hansemann Range of mountains. "Closely related" is relative to the situation in New Guinea. Ethnologue notes that Wagi, for example, may be most closely related to Nobonob, yet they are only 30% lexically similar.

The languages are:
Kare
East Hansemann: Nobonob (Garuh), Wagi (Kamba)
Central Hansemann: Bagupi–Nake, Saruga
North Hansemann: Garus–Rapting, Rempi–Yoidik
Northwest Hansemann: Mosimo–Wamas, Samosa (incl. Murupi)
Southwest Hansemann
North Gogol River: Matepi, Utu–Silopi
South Gogol River: Baimak, Gal, Mawan

References

 
Languages of Papua New Guinea
Mabuso languages